Angela Cropper (c. 1946 – 12 November 2012) of Trinidad and Tobago served as assistant secretary-general and deputy executive director of the United Nations Environment Programme (UNEP). She was appointed to this position by United Nations Secretary-General Ban Ki-moon in November 2007.

Prior to her appointment as ASG, Cropper was an independent senator in the Parliament of Trinidad and Tobago and president of the Cropper Foundation, a not-for-profit charitable organization committed to sustainable development. She shared the 2005 Zayed International Prize for "environmental action leading to positive change in society", along with Emil Salim, the former Indonesian minister for population and the environment. 

She served in various capacities with the Caribbean Community and Common Market Secretariat (CARICOM) and the World Conservation Union (IUCN). She was interim Executive Secretary of the United Nations Convention on Biological Diversity and Senior Adviser on Environment and Development with the United Nations Development Programme (UNDP). 

She also served on a number of international advisory boards, including the CARICOM Task Force on Functional Cooperation, the Council of the United Nations University, the European Union High-Level Panel on Sustainability, the Board of Trustees of the Stockholm Environment Institute, and the External Advisory Group to the World Bank on the implementation of its forest strategy. She was a Visiting Distinguished Fellow with the Woods Hole Research Center, and a Visiting Distinguished Fellow and McCluskey Fellow with the Yale School of Forestry and Environmental Studies. 

She held degrees in development economics from Trinidad and Tobago, and in and international law from Barbados.

Family
Angela Cropper's only child, a son, Devanand, died of heart disease in 1998. Her husband, John, her sister (Lynette Lithgow) and her mother (Maggie Lee) were murdered in December 2001 at the family home in Cascade, Port of Spain, in an apparent robbery. Two men, Lester Pitman and Daniel Agard, were convicted on 14 July 2004, and sentenced to death. Lester Pitman's sentence was later reduced to 40 years' imprisonment.

References

External links
 Cropper's UN profile

1940s births
2012 deaths
Trinidad and Tobago officials of the United Nations
Trinidad and Tobago diplomats
Members of the Senate (Trinidad and Tobago)
United Nations Environment Programme
21st-century Trinidad and Tobago women politicians
21st-century Trinidad and Tobago politicians
Trinidad and Tobago women diplomats